Payal Assembly constituency is one of the 117 Legislative Assembly constituencies of Punjab state in India.

It is in Ludhiana district and is a segment of the Fatehgarh Sahib (Lok Sabha constituency).

Members of the Legislative Assembly

Election results

2022

2017

References

External links
 

Assembly constituencies of Punjab, India
Ludhiana district